The RMIT School of Engineering is an Australian tertiary education school within the College of Science Engineering and Health of RMIT University. It was created in 2016 from the former schools of Aerospace, Mechanical and Manufacturing Engineering, Civil, Environmental and Chemical Engineering, and Electrical and Computer Engineering.

See also
RMIT University

References

External links
School of Engineering

Engineering
Aviation schools
Computer science departments
Information technology schools